Sevgi Salmanlı (born November 21, 1993) is a Turkish women's football forward currently playing in the Turkish Women's First Football League for  Beşiktaş J.K. in Istanbul with jersey number 99. She was a member of the Turkey women's national team.

Personal life
Sevi Salmanlı was born in Küçükçekmece, Istanbul Province, Turkey on November 21, 1993.

She studies in Edirne.

Sports career
Salmanlı began football playing with boys on the street at a very young age, and enjoyed striking a goal by dribbling fast. She liked to continue as a footballer. She was supported in her interest for football playing by her mother, who took her for registration in a club.

Club

Salmanlı obtained her license from Zeytinburnuspor on April 27, 2010. She played one game each for Zeytinburnuspor in the 2009–10 and then for her high school team altınşehir Lisesi Spor in the 2010–11 Second League. In the 2011–12 season, she transferred to Bakırköy Zara, which also played in the Second League. After two and half seasons, Salmanlı joined Kireçburnu Spor in the second half of the 2013–14 Second League season. Her team finished the 2014–15 season as winner, and was promoted to the First League.

She plays in the left wing position.

Salmanlı was transferred by the 2018–19 Women's First League champion Beşiktaş J.K. to play in the 2019–20 UEFA Women's Champions League - Group 9 matches.

International
Salmanlı was admitted to the Turkey national team, and debuted internationally in the match against Romania at the 2017 Goldencity Women's Cup held in Antalya, Turkey on March 1. She capped twice for the nationals.

Career statistics
.

Honours 
 Turkish Women's Second League
 Kireçburnu Spor
 Winners (1): 2014–15

References

External links

Living people
1993 births
People from Küçükçekmece
Footballers from Istanbul
Turkish women's footballers
Women's association football forwards
Kireçburnu Spor players
Beşiktaş J.K. women's football players